The New Mosque (originally named the Hacı Yusuf Taş Mosque) is a mosque in Malatya, Turkey. 

The original mosque was burned down in a fire in Malatya Bazaar in 1889, and was subjected to another fire in 1890 before it was repaired. Reconstruction began in 1893 and was damaged by an earthquake on March 3, 1893.  It took until 1913 to complete the construction.

The rebuilt mosque was damaged by a 1964 earthquake and badly damaged in the 2023 Turkey–Syria earthquake.

References 

Buildings and structures in Malatya
Mosques in Turkey
Buildings damaged by the 2023 Turkey–Syria earthquake